"Mrs. Right" is a song by American boy band Mindless Behavior featuring guest vocals from American rapper Diggy Simmons. The song was written by Mindless Behavior, Dee1, Rickey Deleon, Diggy Simmons and was produced by Walter W. Millsap, Candice "Goldie" Nelson. It was released as the second single from Mindless Behavior's debut studio album #1 Girl (2011) on June 28, 2011 by Interscope and Streamline. They were all between 13 to 15 years old in the song.

Remixes
The official remix of "Mrs. Right" features UK rapper Chipmunk. The music video was released on January 13, 2012 on Polydor Records' YouTube page. The remix was released to iTunes in the UK on February 17, 2012. Also they made a remix with Lil Chuckee which is on Lil Chuckee's mixtape.

Music video
The video was released on June 29, 2011 on VEVO and was directed by Brett Ratner. The video features rapper/actor LL Cool J as a geography teacher and actor Mike Epps as the school janitor. The video starts in a classroom with LL Cool J telling the students that he's gonna take them to every country, starting the song and having the girl students (each dressed from different countries) dance in front of their classmates. It then moves into a gymnasium where the boys are dancing.

There is another video which was added to VEVO that features the remix with Chipmunk. It is the same one but it completely cuts out Diggy Simmons and the intro. Chipmunk does not make an appearance, therefore it's edited with dancing scenes.

Track listings and formats
US digital download
 "Mrs. Right" (feat. Diggy Simmons) – 4:09

Remix single
 "Mrs. Right" (feat. Chipmunk) – 4:09

UK digital download
 "Mrs. Right" (feat. Chipmunk) – 4:09
 "Mrs. Right" (remix) – 3:59

Charts

Weekly charts

Year-end charts

Release history

References

2011 singles
2011 songs
Diggy Simmons songs
Interscope Records singles
Music videos directed by Brett Ratner